Walt Bilicki (born May 1, 1936) is a former Canadian football player who played for the Winnipeg Blue Bombers and BC Lions as a center, guard, and linebacker. Bilicki played for Winnipeg in the first five years of his career and then for BC in the final five years. He intercepted one pass as a linebacker, in 1964, when BC won the 52nd Grey Cup. He also played on Grey Cup winning teams for Winnipeg in 1958 and 1959.

References

1936 births
Winnipeg Blue Bombers players
Living people
BC Lions players
Canadian football people from Montreal
Players of Canadian football from Quebec
Canadian football offensive linemen
Canadian football linebackers